Hokky Situngkir (born February 7, 1978) is an Indonesian scientist who researches complexity theory at Surya University. He is the founder of the Bandung Fe Institute, a research institute for social complexity research. His academic activities include research regarding the aspects of fractal geometry in Indonesian Batik, mathematical aspects of Indonesian traditional folk songs and in the architecture of Borobudur, as well as Indonesian stock market analysis with econophysics alongside Indonesian senior physicist Yohanes Surya. Situngkir helped create the Indonesian Digital Library of Traditional Culture (Perpustakaan Digital Budaya Indonesia) in order to increase public access to information about the diversity of traditional Indonesian culture, for the further application of data sciences.

References 

1978 births
Living people
Indonesian social scientists
Bandung Institute of Technology alumni
Ashoka Fellows
People of Batak descent
Ethnomathematicians
Pematangsiantar
People from North Sumatra